Shlomith Haber-Schaim is an Israeli artist.

Biography 
Shlomith Haber-Schaim, Israeli, was born in Tel Aviv in 1926. Her mother was the artist Rivkah Rieger Kaplan. She studied art in the new Bezalel Academy of Arts and Design, with Mordecai Ardon, and in Chicago. After completing her studies she moved to Boston. In 2005 she returned to Jerusalem and settled in Jerusalem. Her work is in the collection of the Smithsonian American Art Museum

Awards and Prizes 
 1983 Artist-in-residence, Burston Graphic Center, Jerusalem
 1984 Artist-in-residence, Mishkenot Sha'ananim, Jerusalem
 1994 Grant, National Endowment for the Arts, USA
 2014 Artist-in-residence, Scuola Internazionale di Grafica, Venice, Italy

References

External links 
 Shlomith Haber-Schaim - Paintings, Prints and Drawings 1949-2019   http://shlomithart.com/ppd.pdf
 
 

1926 births
Living people
Artists from Tel Aviv
Israeli women painters
Israeli women sculptors
20th-century Israeli sculptors
21st-century Israeli sculptors
20th-century Israeli women artists
21st-century Israeli women artists